Christoph Lehmann may refer to:
 Christoph Lehmann (ski jumper)
 Christoph Lehmann (musician)